= Christopher Fork, Virginia =

Unincorporated community in Virginia, United States

Coordinates: 38°02′26″N 77°13′22″W

Christopher Fork is an unincorporated community in Caroline County, in the U.S. state of Virginia.
